Pešna is a cave in North Macedonia which has been declared a Monument of Culture.

Description 
It is home to swallows and bats. The New York Times compared the cave to Helms Deep from The Lord of the Rings, which speaks about the cave's beauty.

After heavy rain and melting of snow, a spring, which completely dries up during droughts, erupts from the cave's northernmost part.

At the cave's entrance there is a medieval fortress and the remains of a mill. The remains of a fortress in the cave are linked to a region called Devini Kuli visible from inside the cave. According to local legends, both fortresses were homes of Prince Marko's sisters. Pešna is registered as a site from the late antique period in North Macedonia. A tomb dated from late antiquity (5th cent.) with a brick vault was discovered in front of the cave's entrance.

References

External links 

Caves of North Macedonia
Rock-cut tombs